Syysjärvi is a medium-sized lake in the Vuoksi main catchment area. It is located in the region Southern Savonia and the municipality of Juva. On the shore of Kokonlahti bay there is a prehistory rock painting, which is not dated.

See also
 List of lakes in Finland

References

Lakes of Juva